Damir Cvetko (born 27 June 1968) is a retired Croatian football midfielder.

References

1968 births
Living people
Association football midfielders
Croatian footballers
NK Zadar players
NK Varaždin players
Croatian Football League players
Croatian expatriate footballers
Expatriate soccer players in Australia
Croatian expatriate sportspeople in Australia